Duets (retitled Star Collection in some countries) is a compilation album by American singer Barbra Streisand, released on November 26, 2002, by Columbia Records. The collection features nineteen duets from Streisand's career, including two newly-recorded ones: "I Won't Be the One to Let Go" with Barry Manilow and "All I Know of Love" with Josh Groban. The former song was released as the album's lead single on November 4, 2002, as a streaming-only exclusive for AOL Music website members. Duets was reissued in South American countries in 2013 under the title Star Collection with new artwork.

The compilation was executively produced by Streisand and her manager, Jay Landers. Music critics highlighted the album's duets with Ray Charles, Judy Garland, and Frank Sinatra, but were disappointed by her decision to release another compilation album following The Essential Barbra Streisand, which was released earlier in 2002. Commercially, the album peaked within the top ten of record charts in Denmark and the Netherlands; it also entered the Billboard 200 at number 38 and became certified Gold by the Recording Industry Association of America (RIAA) for shipments of 500,000 copies. Duets has gone on to sell 1.5 million records worldwide.

Development and songs 
During 2002, Streisand and Columbia Records released two compilation albums, with the first one being The Essential Barbra Streisand, a greatest hits album mostly consisting of the singer's top ten hits and top forty hits. Later that year, on November 26, she released Duets, a compilation of nineteen duets from her music catalog. The collection was executively produced by Streisand and her manager, Jay Landers.

Fourteen out of the album's nineteen tracks were originally featured on previous Streisand studio albums. In addition, the singer included three songs that were originally performed live with another artist. "I've Got a Crush on You", with Frank Sinatra, initially appeared on his 1993 Duets album, while her rendition of "Ding-Dong! The Witch Is Dead" with Harold Arlen was first released on his 1966 studio album Harold Sings Arlen (With Friend). Her medley of "Get Happy / Happy Days Are Here Again" with Judy Garland was originally performed live on The Judy Garland Show in 1963. With eighteen of the album's songs being duets with other musicians, Streisand's medley of "One Less Bell to Answer" and "A House Is Not a Home" is a duet with herself, first released on the 1971 album Barbra Joan Streisand.

Streisand recorded two new tracks for the album: "I Won't Be the One to Let Go" with Barry Manilow and "All I Know of Love" with Josh Groban. The former track was written by Richard Marx and Manilow, while the latter was written by David Foster and Linda Thompson.

"I Won't Be the One to Let Go" was released as the album's lead and only single on November 4, 2002, as an exclusive download for AOL Music website members. Although the track was not released commercially, "I Won't Be the One to Let Go" was distributed as a promotional CD single on January 6, 2003. With the release handled by Columbia Records, the CD was sent exclusively to United States radio stations and includes the "Radio Version Edit" and "Radio Version" releases of the song. In 2013, Sony Music Entertainment rereleased the compilation in South American countries with a new cover art, but identical track listing, under the title Star Collection.

Critical reception 

AllMusic's William Ruhlmann awarded Duets three out of his five stars during his album review. He wrote that the best performances on the album are her duets with Sinatra, Garland, and Ray Charles. However, Ruhlmann criticized Streisand's role as a duet partner: "Her unsuitability to the duet format is repeatedly evidenced, as she seems virtually incapable of shutting up when her partner is trying to take a solo, invariably humming in the background to draw attention back to herself." Tom Santopietro, author of The Importance of Being Barbra: The Brilliant, Tumultuous Career of Barbra Streisand, was disappointed by Streisand's decision to release two greatest hits albums in the same year (the other being The Essential Barbra Streisand). Nonetheless, he considered the medley inclusion of "One Less Bell to Answer" and "A House Is Not a Home" to be the "standout cut" on Duets. Morag Reavley from BBC Music highlighted the album's array of genres and wrote: "Even the most faithful Streisand acolyte must be delighted by the range of songs and singers assembled." She also enjoyed the inclusion of "I Won't Be the One to Let Go" and "All I Know of Love", writing that the latter track "shows that Barbra can still hold her own".

Commercial performance 
Duets entered and peaked on the Billboard 200 at number 38, during the week of December 14, 2002. It was the chart's eleventh highest debut and would go to spend fourteen weeks on the listing. On January 9, 2003, it was certified Gold by the Recording Industry Association of America (RIAA) for physical shipments of 500,000 copies, 
and during the year-end Billboard 200 chart in 2003, the compilation was listed at number 176. As of June 22, 2007, Duets has sold 561,000 copies in the United States, outselling its predecessor (The Essential Barbra Streisand) by 55,000 copies. In Oceania, the album peaked in Australia and New Zealand at numbers 13 and 11, respectively. In the two aforementioned countries, it received a Gold certification by the Australian Recording Industry Association for shipments of 35,000 copies and a Platinum certification by Recorded Music NZ for shipments of 15,000 copies.

The album entered several record charts across Europe as well. According to the Official Charts Company, it peaked at numbers 39 and 30, in Scotland and the United Kingdom, respectively. In the latter country, the compilation spent 6 weeks charting during 2002 and was ranked on the year-end sales charts at position 89. In Denmark and the Netherlands, Duets peaked within the top ten at numbers 10 and 9, respectively. The album reached number 26 in Spain and received a Gold certification by PROMUSICAE for shipments of 50,000 copies. Its lowest peak positions were achieved in France, Germany, and Switzerland, where the compilation peaked at numbers 44, 53, and 88, respectively. The album has sold over 1.5 million copies worldwide.

Track listing 

Notes
  Mort Lindsey is credited as the track's musical director; no producer is listed

Charts

Weekly charts

Year-end charts

Certifications and sales

Citations

Bibliography

External links 
 

2002 compilation albums
Albums produced by Walter Afanasieff
Albums produced by David Foster
Albums produced by Richard Marx
Albums produced by Jim Steinman
Barbra Streisand compilation albums
Columbia Records compilation albums
Vocal duet albums